Profundiconus loyaltiensis is a species of sea snail, a marine gastropod mollusk in the family Conidae, the cone snails and their allies.

Like all species within the genus Profundiconus, these cone snails are predatory and venomous. They are capable of "stinging" humans, therefore live ones should be handled carefully or not at all.

Description
The size of the shell varies between 19 mm and 22 mm.

Distribution
This marine species occurs off New Caledonia.

References

 Röckel, D., Richard, G. & Moolenbeek, R., 1995. Deep-water Cones (Gastropoda: Conidae) from the New Caledonia region. Mémoires du Muséum national d'Histoire naturelle 167: 557–594
 Tucker J.K. & Tenorio M.J. (2009) Systematic classification of Recent and fossil conoidean gastropods. Hackenheim: Conchbooks. 296 pp.

External links
 The Conus Biodiversity website
 
 Holotype in MNHN, paris

loyaltiensis
Gastropods described in 1995